Customs Regulation 1383/2003, the full title of which is Regulation concerning customs action against goods suspected of infringing certain intellectual property rights and the measures to be taken against goods found to have infringed such rights, is a measure passed under Article 133 (formerly Article 113) of the EC Treaty. The provision is designed to protect the intellectual property rights of constituents of member nations.

The provision encourages EU Member States to facilitate cooperation between their respective customs agencies in preventing IP infringement. It supersedes Customs Regulation 3295/94, with the new provision having taken effect (and the former provision expiring) on July 1, 2004.

The provision permits owners of intellectual property rights "to prohibit entry into the EU and the export or re-export from the EU, of goods infringing: trade marks, copyright, patents, national or Community plant variety rights, designations of origin or geographical indications and geographical designations".

The EU Customs Regulation 608/2013 came into force on July 19, 2013 and replaced the former Regulation 1383/2003.

See also 
Directive on criminal measures aimed at ensuring the enforcement of intellectual property rights (proposed)
Copyright infringement

References 

Intellectual property law of the European Union
1383-2003
2003 in law
2003 in the European Union